The 1689 Convention of Estates sat between 16 March 1689 and 5 June 1689 to determine the settlement of the Scottish throne, following the deposition of James VII in the 1688 Glorious Revolution. The Convention of the Estates of Scotland was a sister-institution to Parliament, comprising the three estates of bishops, barons and representatives of the Burghs. Historically, it had been summoned by the king of Scots for the limited purpose of raising taxes, and could not pass other legislation.  Unlike the English Convention Parliament of 1689, the 1689 Scottish Convention was also a contest for control of the Church of Scotland or Kirk. 

While Scotland played no part in the landing in England and there was little enthusiasm for William and Mary, by November 1688 only a tiny minority actively supported James. Many of William's exile advisors were Scots, including Melville, Argyll, his personal chaplain, William Carstares, and Gilbert Burnet, his chief propagandist. News of James's flight led to celebrations and anti-Catholic riots in Edinburgh and Glasgow and on 7 January 1689, the Scottish Privy Council asked William to take over government, pending a Convention to agree a settlement.

In February, an English Convention appointed William of Orange and his wife Mary as joint monarchs of England. Elections were held in March 1689 for a Scottish Convention; 'Conventions' were identical to Parliaments in composition but only discussed specific issues, the previous one held in 1678 to approve taxes. Of the 125 delegates elected, 75 were classed as Presbyterian, 50 as Episcopalian, making the Convention a contest over control of the Church of Scotland, as well as the limits of Royal authority. 

William's nominee, the 3rd Duke of Hamilton, was elected President of the Convention, although his son remained loyal to James. Despite being a minority, the Episcopalians were hopeful of retaining control of the Kirk since William supported the retention of bishops. However, on 12 March, James landed in Ireland and on 16th, a Letter to the Convention was read out, demanding obedience and threatening punishment for non-compliance. 

Public anger at this meant some Episcopalians stopped attending the Convention, claiming to fear for their safety while others changed sides. Tensions were high, with the Duke of Gordon holding Edinburgh Castle for James and Viscount Dundee recruiting Highland levies. This exaggerated the Presbyterian majority in the Convention which met behind closed doors guarded by its own troops.

The English Parliament held James 'abandoned' his throne by fleeing from London to France; since the same argument could not be used in Scotland, the Convention argued he 'forfeited' it by his actions, listed in the Articles of Grievances. This was a fundamental change; if Parliament could decide James had forfeited his throne, monarchs derived legitimacy from Parliament, not God, ending the principle of Divine Right of Kings.

The throne was offered to Mary and William, who was granted regal power on the basis he held the throne de facto, by right of conquest. In an attempt to preserve Episcopalianism, the Scottish Bishops proposed Union with England but this was rejected by the English Parliament. On 11 April, the Convention ended James' reign and adopted the Articles of Grievances and Claim of Right Act, making Parliament the primary legislative power in Scotland.

On 11 May 1689, William and Mary accepted the Scottish throne and the Convention became a full Parliament on 5 June. The 1689 Jacobite Rising highlighted the new regimes' reliance on Presbyterian support and led to the final expulsion of bishops from the Kirk in the 1690 Act of Settlement. The ending of Episcopacy isolated a significant part of the Scottish political class; in the 18th century, Nonjuring Episcopalians were a key support base of the Scottish Jacobite movement.

James and the Jacobites viewed the Convention as “illegal” and argued that the declaration of forfeiture was not valid because the authority of a Scottish Convention of Estates was limited to revenue raising measures and the Convention had not been called by the rightful king.

References

Sources
 
 
 
 

 
 

Parliament of Scotland
Rival successions
1689 in Scotland
1689 in politics
Scottish monarchy
History of Edinburgh
Glorious Revolution
Constitutional conventions (political meeting)